Pegula may refer to:

People
Jessica Pegula (born 1994), American tennis player
Kim Pegula (born 1969), American businesswoman
Terry Pegula (born 1951), American billionaire

Other
Pegula Ice Arena, multi-purpose arena in University Park, Pennsylvania
Pegula Sports and Entertainment, American holding company